Jamésie is a territory equivalent to a regional county municipality (TE) of Nord-du-Québec, Canada.

Its geographical code is 991 and together with Kativik TE and Eeyou Istchee TE it forms the administrative région and census division (CD) of Nord-du-Québec  It is located to the east of James Bay, after which the territory is named. Chibougamau is the largest community in both Jamésie TE and Nord-du-Québec.

The original 2006 census land area was reduced by about 1.74 percent and the population was reduced by 47.25 percent by the creation and departure of the Eeyou Istchee TE in 2007.  Further administration changes came under the terms of the Agreement on Governance in the Eeyou Istchee James Bay Territory of July 24, 2012, when the local municipality of Baie-James within Jamésie ceased to exist, and was replaced by the local municipality of Eeyou Istchee James Bay Territory, which is specialized local municipality governed and managed jointly by the Cree of Eeyou Istchee TE and the non-Cree of Jamésie TE.

Subdivisions
The TE of Jamésie consists of:

 the municipality (M) of Eeyou Istchee James Bay Regional Government,
 the enclaved cities (V) of
 Lebel-sur-Quévillon
 Matagami
 Chapais
 Chibougamau

References

 Nord-du-Québec Census Division, Quebec Statistics Canada
 Database of the geographical code of Quebec.
 Regional maps of municipal and RCM/TE boundaries from the Ministère des Affaires municipales et des Régions
Map of Baie-James / Jamésie

External links
 Website of the Eeyou Istchee James Bay Regional Government 
 Grand Council of the Crees
 Cree Tourism

 
Territories equivalent to a regional county municipality
Eeyou Istchee (territory)